William Bigg may refer to:

William Redmore Bigg (1755–1828), British painter
William Bigg (High Sheriff of Berkshire), High Sheriff of Berkshire in 1656
William Bygge, Mayor of Canterbury in 1461 and 1467